Panorama FM is an Arabic language music Radio Channel broadcast by the Middle East Broadcasting Center.

External links

Mass media in the United Arab Emirates
Arab mass media
Radio stations established in 2005